Oğuz is a village in the Beşiri District of Batman Province in Turkey. The village is populated by Kurds and had a population of 405 in 2021. The village is populated by Yazidis.

The hamlets of Akdoğan, Kışlacık, Onbaşı and Yavuz are attached to the village. Onbaşı is populated by Yazidis as well.

References 

Villages in Beşiri District
Kurdish settlements in Batman Province
Yazidi villages in Turkey